The 1986 Houston Oilers season was the 27th season overall and 17th with the National Football League (NFL). The team matched their previous season's output of 5–11, and missed the playoffs for the sixth consecutive season.

Offseason

NFL draft

Personnel

Staff/Coaches

Roster

Schedule

Note: Intra-division opponents are in bold text.

Standings

References

Houston Oilers
Houston Oilers seasons
Houston